= Sonia Feldman =

American writer and novelist

Sonia Feldman is an American writer from Cleveland, Ohio. She is the recipient of the PEN/Robert J. Dau Short Story Prize for Emerging Writers and the author of the debut novel Girl's Girl (2026). Her poetry and fiction have appeared in literary journals including The Missouri Review, The Southern Review, and Waxwing.

== Early life and education ==
Feldman is from Cleveland, Ohio. She attended the University of Chicago, where she completed the Master of Arts Program in the Humanities (MAPH), studying English literature and creative writing.

== Career ==
Feldman's fiction and poetry have appeared in The Missouri Review, The Southern Review, Waxwing, Beloit Poetry Journal, 7x7 and YES PLZ.

Her short story "Outgrowth" was originally published in Waxwing and received the 2023 PEN/Robert J. Dau Short Story Prize for Emerging Writers in 2023. It was subsequently published in Catapult's Best Debut Short Stories 2023.

Feldman's debut novel, Girl's Girl, was published by Dial Press in 2026. Reviewing the novel for The New York Times, Sanjena Sathian describes it as a "lustrous debut" and writes, "Feldman brings an Austenian attentiveness to the foibles of suburban adolescence."

Feldman is also the creator of Sonia's Poem of the Week, an email newsletter featuring contemporary poetry and commentary.

== Awards and recognition ==
- PEN/Robert J. Dau Short Story Prize for Emerging Writers (2023)
- Literary Cleveland named her a Breakthrough Writing Resident (2022).
